USCGC Bristol Bay (WTGB-102) is the second vessel of the s built in 1978 and operated by the United States Coast Guard. The ship was named after the body of water formed by the Alaskan peninsula, which emptied into the Bering Sea.

Design 

The 140-foot Bay-class tugboats operated primarily for domestic ice breaking duties. They are named after American bays and are stationed mainly in the northeast United States and the Great Lakes.

WTGBs use a low pressure air hull lubrication or bubbler system that forces air and water between the hull and ice. This system improves icebreaking capabilities by reducing resistance against the hull, reducing horsepower requirements.

Construction and career 
Bristol Bay was built by the Tacoma Boatbuilding Co., in Tacoma, Washington in 1978. She was commissioned in Detroit, 1979.

In August 1991, Bristol Bay became the first Bay-class tugboat to receive a barge specially designed to perform aids to navigation work. The  barge works with the ship to service more than 160 aids to navigation each year.

 and Bristol Bay were deployed for ice breaking at the St. Clair River, on 25 February 2019.

On 25 January 2022, Bristol Bay and  freed the lake freighter Assiniboione after being stuck on ice at St. Clair River.

Awards 

 Coast Guard Unit Commendation
 Coast Guard Meritorious Unit Commendation
 Coast Guard Meritorious Team Commendation
 Coast Guard Bicentennial Unit Commendation
 National Defense Service Medal
 Global War on Terrorism Service Medal
 Humanitarian Service Medal
 Transportation 9-11 Ribbon
 Coast Guard Special Operations Service Ribbon 
 Coast Guard Sea Service Medal

References

United States Coast Guard home page
United States Coast Guard Reservist Magazine

External links 

 United States Coast Guard: Bristol Bay
 TogetherWeServed: Bristol Bay Crew Members

Bristol Bay
1978 ships
Ships built in Tacoma, Washington